Paul James Foster  (born 13 March 1973) is a multiple world bowls champion who lives in Troon, Scotland. He plays at Troon Portland (Outdoor) & Ambassador Prestwick (Indoor) bowling clubs.

Bowling career

Indoor career 

Foster is the second most prolific winner of the World Indoor Championship singles title, behind six-times winner, pairs partner and close friend Alex Marshall. He has five wins from seven final appearances (in 1998, 2001, 2005, 2011 and 2017), with his two defeats coming in the 2013 final to Stewart Anderson and in the 2022 final to Les Gillett. 

In addition, Foster has won another eight world indoor titles, bringing his career record to 13. He has won the pairs five times, once with Hugh Duff in 2002 and four times with Alex Marshall (2011, 2012, 2013, and 2019). He has won the Mixed Pairs title with Laura Thomas in 2013 and 2014 and with Alison Merrien in 2022.

He was the first bowler to win back-to-back major WBT titles and a record firth major WBT title in 2007, and in 2009, he added a record sixth, which made him the WBT world number one for the first time. So far, Foster has a record 11 WBT majors to his name.

Outdoor career

Commonwealth Games
He has four Commonwealth Games Gold medals, two in pairs competition with his partner, Alex Marshall (in 2006 and 2014), and two in the fours event (in 2014 and 2018 both with Marshall too).

He won a pairs silver as part of the Scottish team for the 2018 Commonwealth Games with Alex Marshall. He then won a fourth career Commonwealth Games gold in the Fours with Marshall, Ronnie Duncan and Derek Oliver. 

In 2022, he competed in the men's pairs and the men's fours at the 2022 Commonwealth Games. Partnering Marshall, they won the pairs bronze medal.

World Championships
During the 2012 World Outdoor Bowls Championship Foster and Marshall added the World Outdoor Pairs title, becoming the first players to win the indoor and outdoor pairs titles in the same year. In 2016, two more bronze medals were added, when he competed in the 2016 World Outdoor Bowls Championship in Christchurch.

In 2020, he was selected for the 2020 World Outdoor Bowls Championship in Australia.

Awards 
He was inducted into the World Bowls Tour (WBT) Hall of Fame in 2008, as well as winning Players' Player of the Year and Performance of the Year at the inaugural World Bowls Tour Awards in 2008. In 2010, Foster won WBT Player of the Year and Players' Player of the Year. In 2012, he was again voted WBT Player of the Year and Players' Player of the Year, also winning Shot of the Year He won another three awards in 2013, which were for Fans' Player of the Year, Performance of the Year, and Shot of the Year.

Foster was selected as SIBA Men's Indoor Player of the Year in 2017 and 2018. He was also inducted in to SIBA Hall of Fame in 2018. At the Team Scotland Sports Awards, Foster and Marshall were voted Team of the Year in 2019.

Foster was appointed Member of the Order of the British Empire (MBE) in the 2014 New Year Honours for services to bowls.

Honours (wins and gold only)

References

External links
 
 
 
 
 

1973 births
Living people
Scottish male bowls players
Members of the Order of the British Empire
Bowls World Champions
Indoor Bowls World Champions
Commonwealth Games silver medallists for Scotland
Commonwealth Games gold medallists for Scotland
Commonwealth Games medallists in lawn bowls
Bowls players at the 2006 Commonwealth Games
Bowls players at the 2014 Commonwealth Games
Bowls players at the 2018 Commonwealth Games
Bowls players at the 2022 Commonwealth Games
Commonwealth Games bronze medallists for Scotland
Medallists at the 2006 Commonwealth Games
Medallists at the 2014 Commonwealth Games
Medallists at the 2018 Commonwealth Games
Medallists at the 2022 Commonwealth Games